Santa Maria Assunta  is a 12th-century Roman Catholic church building in the frazione of Borsigliana  in the town limits of Piazza al Serchio, province of Lucca, region of Tuscany, Italy.

History
The church was initially documented by 1020, but refurbished along the centuries, including a major reconstruction in the 18th century. Some of the walls are from the original church. The bas relief,  depicting a Madonna and Child with saints and a donor, on the lunette of façade portal dates from the 15th century. Inside the church has a late 15th-century triptych depicting the Madonna and Child with Saints, set into an elaborate Gothic or Byzantine frame, attributed to the Maestro di Borsigliana, now known as Pietro da Talada.

References

Churches in the province of Lucca
11th-century Roman Catholic church buildings in Italy
Romanesque architecture in Tuscany